Henrik Dahl (born 1 May 1975) is a Swedish football coach and former professional player who has been technical director at Bærum SK since December 2015. in the Norwegian 1st division.

Playing career
Dahl was born in Gödestad, Varberg. He played for Grimeton IK, Varbergs BoIS FC, BK Häcken, GAIS, in Denmark for Silkeborg IF and in Norway for Bærum SK and FC Lyn Oslo. He played as a fullback.

Coaching career
 Assistant manager: Bærum SK, 2012–2014
 Player development coach, 2013–2014
 UEFA-B license, 2012
 UEFA-A license, 2014
 UEFA Elite Youth A license, 2015
 Norges Fotballforbund FLK 4, 2018

Personal life
After retiring from football, Dahl was a sales and marketing manager at Hard Rock Cafe, Oslo for three years, and then joined Radio Metro, Oslo as a key account manager in 2011. He was an assistant coach in Bærum SK for three years while also director of sports (children and youth) at Lyn Fotball in 2014–2015. Since December 2015 he has been technical director at Bærum SK and player development coach at Fotballprogresjon Norge AS.

References

http://baerumsk.no/fredags-fakta-henrik-dahl/

http://baerumsk.no/sportssjefen-henrik-dahl/

http://baerumsk.no/en-kaffekopp-med-sportslig-leder/

External links
 

1975 births
Living people
Swedish footballers
Association football defenders
Allsvenskan players
Eliteserien players
BK Häcken players
GAIS players
Silkeborg IF players
Lyn Fotball players
Bærum SK players
Swedish expatriate footballers
Swedish expatriate football managers
Swedish expatriate sportspeople in Denmark
Expatriate men's footballers in Denmark
Swedish expatriate sportspeople in Norway
Expatriate footballers in Norway
Expatriate football managers in Norway